ISO 3166-2:FJ is the entry for Fiji in ISO 3166-2, part of the ISO 3166 standard published by the International Organization for Standardization (ISO), which defines codes for the names of the principal subdivisions (e.g., provinces or states) of all countries coded in ISO 3166-1.

Currently for Fiji, ISO 3166-2 codes are defined for 4 divisions, 1 dependency,  and 14 provinces.

Each code consists of two parts, separated by a hyphen. The second part is a letter for divisions and dependency, and 2 digits for provinces.

Current codes
Subdivision names are listed as in the ISO 3166-2 standard published by the ISO 3166 Maintenance Agency (ISO 3166/MA).

Click on the button in the header to sort each column.

Divisions and dependency

Provinces

See also
 Subdivisions of Fiji
 FIPS region codes of Fiji

External links
 ISO Online Browsing Platform: FJ
 Divisions of Fiji, Statoids.com

2:FJ
ISO 3166-2
Fiji geography-related lists